Martine Carol (born Marie-Louise Jeanne Nicolle Mourer; 16 May 1920 – 6 February 1967) was a French film actress.

Career
Born Maryse Mourer  (or Marie-Louise Jeanne Nicolle Mourer) in Saint-Mandé, Val-de-Marne, (France), she studied acting under René Simon (1898–1966), making her stage début in 1940 and her first motion picture in 1943. She frequently was cast as an elegant blonde seductress. During the late 1940s and early 1950s, she was the leading sex symbol and a top box-office draw of French cinema, and she was considered a French version of America's Marilyn Monroe. One of her more famous roles was as the title character in Lola Montès (1955), directed by Max Ophüls, in a role that required dark hair. However, by the late 1950s, roles for Carol had become fewer, partly because of the introduction of Brigitte Bardot.

Personal life
Despite her fame and fortune, Martine Carol's personal life was filled with turmoil that included a suicide attempt, drug abuse, and four marriages. She also was kidnapped by gangster Pierre Loutrel (also known as Pierrot le Fou or Crazy Pete), albeit briefly and received roses the next day as an apology. 

Carol was married four times, including:
 Joseph Stephen Crane, American actor and restaurant manager, previously Lana Turner's husband, married in 1948, divorced in 1953.
 Christian-Jaque, film director, married July 15, 1954, divorced in 1959.
 Dr. André Rouveix, a young doctor she met in Martinique, Fort-de-France, married August 3, 1959, divorced in 1962.
 Mike Eland, English businessman, married in 1966 until her death. 

Carol died unexpectedly of a heart attack in a hotel room in Monte Carlo at the age of 46 while shooting the film Hell Is Empty (1967). She was first buried in Paris's Père Lachaise Cemetery, but after her grave was vandalized—some media reported that she had been interred with her jewels—was reburied in the Grand Jas Cemetery of Cannes (square n°3).

Filmography

References

Bibliography

External links

 
 
 

1920 births
1967 deaths
People from Saint-Mandé
French film actresses
French expatriates in Monaco
Burials at the Cimetière du Grand Jas
20th-century French actresses